Md. Wali Ullah is a Bangladesh Awami League politician and the former Member of Parliament of Noakhali-6.

Career
Ullah was elected to parliament from Noakhali-6 as a Bangladesh Awami League candidate in 1991.

References

Awami League politicians
Living people
5th Jatiya Sangsad members
Year of birth missing (living people)
People from Hatiya Upazila